Pavlov is a municipality and village in Šumperk District in the Olomouc Region of the Czech Republic. It has about 700 inhabitants.

Administrative parts
The villages of Radnice and Veselí are administrative parts of Pavlov.

References

Villages in Šumperk District